Zauberberg (English: Magic Mountain) is the second album by Wolfgang Voigt's Gas project. It was first released on vinyl in December 1997 on the Mille Plateaux label, with a CD release following in February 1998. The album is named in reference to the Thomas Mann novel The Magic Mountain (Der Zauberberg). It is the first Gas album to incorporate the forest imagery that would become a trademark of the project. Reviews generally cite Zauberberg as the darkest, most dissonant Gas release.

The CD and vinyl pressings feature notable differences. The songs are re-ordered for the CD format, with several presented as extended versions. For Zauberberg's inclusion in the Nah und Fern boxed set, track 6 of the CD was replaced with an extended version of the same piece. Gas' second boxed set, Box, features tracks 1, 3, 6 and 7 of the CD in extended format.

Track listing

Vinyl pressing

Compact disc pressing

Box version (2016)

References

Gas (musician) albums
1997 albums